is a city located in the western portion of Tokyo Metropolis, Japan. , the city had an estimated population of 92,585 in 41,592 households, and a population density of 5200 persons per km².

Geography
Inagi is located in the south-central portion of Tokyo Metropolis, approximately 25 kilometers from the center of Tokyo. The Tama River flows through the city, which is bordered by Kanagawa Prefecture to the south.

Surrounding municipalities
Tokyo Metropolis
Chōfu
Fuchū
Tama
Kanagawa Prefecture
Kawasaki

Climate
Inagi has a Humid subtropical climate (Köppen Cfa) characterized by warm summers and cool winters with light to no snowfall.  The average annual temperature in Inagi is 14.3 °C. The average annual rainfall is 1647 mm with September as the wettest month. The temperatures are highest on average in August, at around 25.6 °C, and lowest in January, at around 3.2 °C.

Demographics
Per Japanese census data, the population of Inagi has increased steadily since the 1950s.

History
The area of Inagi has been settled since the Japanese Paleolithic, or for over 20,000 years, based on projectile points, stone tools and microliths found in several locations within city borders. There is evidence of several Jomon period settlements, but settlement disappeared towards the end of the Jomon period due to climate change and eruptions of Mount Fuji. The area was sparely settled in the Yayoi period, with increasing settlement density in the Kofun period. A number of Nara period remains have been found, including the ruins of a roof tile kiln. During the Heian period, the area became part of a shōen controlled by the Oyamada clan, and later by their cadet branch, the Inabe clan into the Kamakura period, and was an area contested between competing branches of the Ashikaga clan and Uesugi clan in the Muromachi and Sengoku periods. After the start of the Edo period, the area was tenryō controlled directly by the Tokugawa shogunate.  Inagi as a municipality was founded on April 1, 1889 as a village in what was then Minamitama District, Kanagawa Prefecture, from the merger of 6 pre-Meiji period hamlets with the establishment of the modern municipalities system. The district was transferred to the administrative control of Tokyo Metropolis on April 1, 1893.

On April 1, 1957, Inagi Village was promoted to town status, and to city status on November 1, 1971.

Government
Inagi has a mayor-council form of government with a directly elected mayor and a unicameral city council of 22 members. Inagi, together with the city of Tam,  contributes two members to the Tokyo Metropolitan Assembly. In terms of national politics, the city is divided between the Tokyo 21st district and  Tokyo 22nd district of the lower house of the Diet of Japan.

Elections 
 2007 Inagi local election

Economy
Inagi is largely a bedroom community for central Tokyo due to extensive new town public housing projects in the late 1950s, 1960s and 1970s. There is also some residual agriculture, notably pears and grapes. The paper manufacturer, Nippon Filcon is headquartered in Inagi.

Education
Tertiary:
Komazawa Women's University
Komazawa Women's Junior College

The Tokyo Metropolitan Government Board of Education operates one high school:

Previously  existed.

Inagi has twelve public elementary schools and six public junior high schools operated by the Inagi City Board of Education.

Municipal junior high schools:
 Inagi No. 1 (稲城第一中学校)
 Inagi No. 2 (稲城第二中学校)
 Inagi No. 3 (稲城第三中学校)
 Inagi No. 4 (稲城第四中学校)
 Inagi No. 5 (稲城第五中学校)
 Inagi No. 6 (稲城第六中学校)

Municipal elementary schools:
 Hirao (平尾小学校)
 Inagi No. 1 (稲城第一小学校)
 Inagi No. 2 (稲城第二小学校)
 Inagi No. 3 (稲城第三小学校)
 Inagi No. 4 (稲城第四小学校)
 Inagi No. 6 (稲城第六小学校)
 Inagi No. 7 (稲城第七小学校)
 Koyodai (向陽台小学校)
 Minamiyama (南山小学校)
 Nagamine (長峰小学校)
 Shiroyama (城山小学校)
 Wakabadai (若葉台小学校)

There is one private junior-senior high school:

Transportation

Railway
 JR East – Nambu Line
 -  -  
 Keio Corporation - Keio Sagamihara Line
 -

Highway
   Chūō Expressway - Inagi IC

Local attractions
Yomiuriland Amusement Park

Sports

Tokyo Verdy, men's football team
NTV Beleza, women's football team

Notable people from Inagi
Kunio Okawara, anime mechanical designer

References

External links

Inagi City Official Website 

Cities in Tokyo
Western Tokyo